Fools' Parade or Fool's Parade may refer to:
Fools' Parade, American 1971 drama film
Fool's Parade, album by Peter Wolf